American Greed is an hour-long American television show that currently airs on CNBC,  Escape (TV network), and CourtTV's over-the-air "MYSTERY" channel. The show profiles various cases involving corporate fraud and white collar crimes. Some of the episodes profile two of these cases in a single episode.

The show has been on the air since June 21, 2007, and was renewed for its 13th season, which started airing in August 2019. Stacy Keach is the narrator for the series.

Series overview

Episodes

Season 1 (2007)

Season 2 (2008)

Season 3 (2009)

Season 4 (2010)

Season 5 (2011)

Season 6 (2012)

Season 7 (2013)

Season 8 (2014)

Season 9 (2015)

Season 10 (2016)

Season 11 (2017)

Season 12 (2018)

Season 13 (2019–20)

Season 14 (2021)

Season 15 (2022)

Specials

References

External links 
 
 

Lists of American non-fiction television series episodes